The 2018–19 US SuperTour was a season of the US SuperTour, a Continental Cup season in cross-country skiing for men and women. The season began on 1 December 2018 in West Yellowstone, Montana and concluded with on 30 March 2019 in Presque Isle, Maine.

Calendar

Men

Women

Overall standings

Men's overall standings

Women's overall standings

References

External links
Men's Overall standings (FIS)
Women's Overall standings (FIS)

US SuperTour
US SuperTour seasons
2018 in cross-country skiing
2019 in cross-country skiing